Chloris cucullata is a species of grass known by the common name hooded windmill grass. It is native to the United States, particularly the states of Texas and New Mexico, and adjacent Mexico.

This is a clump-forming perennial grass with erect stems up to 60 centimeters tall. The leaf blades are up to 20 centimeters long, the longer ones located around the base. The panicle contains whorls of spikelets, each whorl with several branches up to 5 centimeters long. The branches are purplish, drying brown.

References

External links
USDA Plants Profile

cucullata
Bunchgrasses of North America
Grasses of Mexico
Grasses of the United States
Flora of New Mexico
Flora of Northeastern Mexico
Native grasses of Texas